Wielgie may refer to the following places:
Wielgie, Golub-Dobrzyń County in Kuyavian-Pomeranian Voivodeship (north-central Poland)
Wielgie, Lipno County in Kuyavian-Pomeranian Voivodeship (north-central Poland)
Wielgie, Łódź Voivodeship (central Poland)
Wielgie, Masovian Voivodeship (east-central Poland)